Angermann is a surname. Notable people with the surname include:

 Peter Angermann (born 1945), German painter
 Norbert Angermann (born 1936), German historian
 Erich Angermann (1927−1992), German historian

See also
 Angermann River, a former spelling of the Swedish Ångerman